A gun buyback program is one instituted to purchase privately owned firearms. The purported goal of such programs is to reduce the number of guns sold illegally. A buyback program would provide a process whereby civilians can sell their privately owned firearms to the government without risk of prosecution. In most cases, the agents purchasing the guns are local police when purchasing firearms on behalf of the government. The term is in most cases a misnomer since the purchasers are rarely those who initially sold the guns, so guns are bought, not bought back. A gun buyback program can either be voluntary, or it can be mandatory with penalties for failure to sell.

Argentina
In July 2007, Argentina initiated a national gun buyback program that ran until December 2008.  Participation in the program was voluntary and anonymous.  Individuals received between 100 and 450 pesos (or US$30 to US$145) per firearm depending on its type.  All types of firearms were accepted including legal as well as illegal weapons. The 2007-2008 buyback collected a total of 104,782 firearms or around 7% of the country's estimated total number of firearms as well as 747,000 units of ammunition.

Australia

There have been 28 state and territory-based amnesties since the Port Arthur massacre in April 1996. The "National Firearms Buyback Program", which ran from October 1996 through September 1997, was held for 12 months and retrieved 650,000 guns. The 2003 handgun buyback ran for 6 months and retrieved 68,727 guns. Both involved compensation paid to owners of firearms made illegal by gun law changes and surrendered to the government. Bought back firearms were destroyed.

The Government increased the Medicare levy from 1.5% to 1.7% of income for one year to finance the 1996 buyback program. The program was budgeted to cost $500 million. The buyback cost $304 million in compensation and $63 million in administration.

Brazil

In two gun buyback programs between 2003 and 2009, the Brazilian government collected and destroyed over 1.1 million guns. In 2004, the Brazilian government implemented a six-month national gun buyback program that met its stated objective of collecting 80,000 guns in less than three months. The government budgeted $3 million for the program, in which participants were given up to $100 per gun that they handed in.

Part of the 2004 buyback included strengthening gun regulations such as: making it illegal to own unregistered firearms or to carry a gun outside of one's home; raising the minimum age to own a gun to 25; and imposing new penalties on those that violate these laws. One study suggests that the buyback "contributed to the observed reduction in firearm related mortality."

Canada

In May 2022, Canadian Prime Minister Justin Trudeau announced a proposed ban of handguns and a buyback program, with compensation varying from around $1,300 to more than $6,000. On October 21, 2022, a national freeze of handgun sales went into effect.

United States
Philadelphia tried gun buybacks in 1968, 1972 and 1974, retrieving 544 guns. Baltimore staged a 3 month buyback in 1974 offering $50 for each gun, resulting in the retrieval of 13,400 firearms, including about 8,400 handguns. Similar programs followed in other cities, including some cities that repeated their programs. In 1994 researchers analyzed a 1992 buyback in Seattle, Washington where 1,172 firearms were relinquished. The study found "Comparing firearm-related events per month before and after the program, crimes and deaths increased, and injuries decreased, but the changes were not statistically significant." The study also concluded "effect on decreasing violent crime and reducing firearm mortality is unknown." In the 2020 Democratic Party presidential primary, candidates Cory Booker, Bernie Sanders, and Beto O'Rourke indicated support for gun buyback programs.

Arizona
Gun buybacks have been held in Tucson (one in 2013) and Phoenix (three in 2013).

In 2013, House Bill 2455 was signed into law by Governor Jan Brewer. H.B. 2455 and Arizona Revised Statute 12-945 were enacted after lobbying by the National Rifle Association and other organizations and require that firearms seized by, surrendered to or acquired by law enforcement or other government agencies may not be destroyed. Firearms acquired through programs such as gun buybacks or seized in the course of a criminal investigation that are legal for private citizens to possess must be disposed of by sale to a federal firearms licensed dealer. These statutes have raised controversy, with opponents charging that the statutes will turn gun buybacks into recycling programs. Proponents of the measures point out that firearms purchased through private buyback programs may be destroyed.

California
On December 15, 2012, the day after the Sandy Hook Elementary School shooting in Newtown, Connecticut, an anonymous donor funded gun buyback events in Oakland and San Francisco. Hundreds of area residents received $200 cash for each firearm sold, "no questions asked." The guns were to be destroyed. A mile-long line of cars lined up into the East Oakland church parking lot that served as that community's exchange location, prompting the private donor to double his contribution.

Over 600 guns were bought between the two locations. One week later, it was learned that the event was largely funded by a medical marijuana dispensary, whose executive director said, "It's part of the philosophy we practice called capitalism with a conscience."

Started in 2009, an ongoing anonymous buyback program in Los Angeles offers retail gift cards in exchange for guns.

Maryland
For two months in 1974, the Baltimore Police Department ran what is believed to have been the first gun buyback program in the U.S. Police commissioner Donald Pomerleau, not known as an advocate for strict gun control, reportedly came up with the idea while at a funeral for an officer who was shot in the line of duty. Operation PASS (People Against Senseless Shootings) paid a $50 "bounty" for surrendered guns and $100 for tips leading to the confiscation of illegal guns. Some bounty seekers attempted to game the system by buying cheap, new guns that retailed for $21.95 and then trying to turn them in. In all, the police collected 13,500 firearms - mostly handguns - at a cost of over $660,000. However, the city's already high gun homicide and assault rates actually increased during the program, for which police officials offered no explanation.

Massachusetts
From July 12–14, 2006, the Boston Police Department collected 1,000 firearms. Residents received a $200 Target gift card for each gun donated.

Michigan
At an August 2012 buyback, the Detroit Police Department paid $16,820 for 365 guns, including six assault weapons and a few sawed-off shotguns. The guns were collected at a church where participants could receive $50 to $100 for unloaded, operational weapons. Gun-carrying protesters offered to purchase the firearms from those in line for more money than the police were offering.

New Jersey
A buyback in Camden, New Jersey, in December 2012 collected 1,137 firearms. In April 2013, Newark Police Department collected more than 200 firearms during a buyback funded by Jewelry for a Cause. This was the first buyback in the city's history to be completely funded through private sources. Such programs allow residents to turn in guns for cash. In January 2014, Newark police director Samuel DeMaio said he was reviewing the implementation of an ongoing program instead of once or twice a year. Gun buybacks in several locations in Essex County, New Jersey, including Newark, collected about 1,700 guns in February 2013.

Washington 
The city of Seattle has experimented with gun buyback programs since the early 1990s.  Seattle's 1992 gun buyback was initiated in response to a string of shootings in a local neighborhood. The buyback program was watched with great interest given the local demographic and the generally positive public support for the buyback from residents of Seattle and the surrounding area. A public health survey titled "Money for Guns" was conducted and while it concluded that no statistically significant result was produced on Seattle's gun crime or gun death ratio, the report maintained that a larger buyback program would be sure to yield positive results.  Over 20 years later Seattle would again make headline for its bold gun buyback program in 2013, but perhaps not for the reasons the programs sponsors and organizers would have liked. While the program, could be considered a success, collecting more than 700 guns, handing out almost $70,000 in gift cards and even netting a Stinger missile launcher tube. the program also had a widely unanticipated effect from the local gun buying community. Hundreds of gun buyers showed up to the event seeking to offer cash for valuable antiques or functioning second hand firearms. The lack of any need for background check in transactions involving private firearms sales turned the city sponsored event into an open air gun bazaar.  Since then other cities have experienced similar situations, including private sales and/or local gun owners taking advantage of lucrative gift card offers to unload rusted or non-functioning firearms onto the police.

New Zealand
New Zealand introduced the Arms (Prohibited Firearms, Magazines, and Parts) Amendment Bill in March 2019 as an amendment to existing legislation with the aim of strengthening gun control. This bill was introduced following the Christchurch mosque shootings along with a government-funded gun buyback program. New Zealand Police reported that around 47,000 firearms were collected.

References

Further reading

Crime prevention
Gun politics
Product return